Achaea is a genus of moths in the family Erebidae described by Jacob Hübner in 1923.

Species

References

 
Noctuoidea genera
Taxa named by Jacob Hübner